is a fashion model from Japan. She is from Iwate. She appeared in the show-business production Avant-gardes. She was a gravure idol.

Career 
She won Miss Young Magazine in 1998, then became a model. At present, she mainly appears on TV variety programs. In February 2007, she married Japanese comedian Monkikki. On March 11, 2010, she had her first child.

Yamakawa will star in the 2016 rock musical Stand in the World, based on the music of Head Phones President.

Activities

TV Programs 
 Human Variety Nichiyo no Magellan (ヒューマンバラエティ 日曜のマゼラン), Higashinippon Broadcasting
 S Para (Sパラ), Television Kanagawa
 Kiseki Taiken Unbelievable (奇跡体験!アンビリバボー), Fuji Television
 Heroine Tanjo (ヒロイン誕生), TV Osaka
 Urinari Geinojin Shako Dance Bu (ウリナリ芸能人社交ダンス部), Nippon Television
 Tensai Terebikun Wide (天才てれびくんワイド), 2001–03
 Tensai Terebikun MAX (天才てれびくんMAX), 2003–04
 Tokyo Niwa-tsuki Ikkodate (東京庭付き一戸建て), Nippon Television 2002
 Indies Wars (インディーウォーズ), Nippon Television 2004

Radio Program 
 ERIKA'S BAY NIGHT CRUISIN, bayfm

Stage Dramas 
 Heidi, 2002
 Anne of Green Gables, 2003–04

Other appearances 
 Ø Story (2000)
 Dramatic Dream Team (2003), a comedy pro wrestling promotion, where she wins the Ironman Heavymetalweight Championship once

Bibliography

Photo books 
 Yosei (妖精 / A Fairy), Bunkasha 1999
 OK Baby, Wani Books 2000
 Hidamari to Bidama (陽だまりとビー玉 / A Place in the Sun and Marbles), Saibunkan 2000

References

External links
Erika Yamakawa’s Profile  - Within her talent agency “Avant-gardes”
Erika Biyori  - Official Blog with her photographs, since January 2007
Erika Yamakawa's Natural Life  - Another Official Blog with her photographs, since December 2006

1982 births
Living people
Japanese idols
Japanese actresses
Ironman Heavymetalweight Champions